Ballast is any material used to provide stability to a vehicle or structure.

Ballast may also refer to:

Objects

 Ballast tank, a device used on ships and submarines and other submersibles to control buoyancy and stability
 Ballast weights – Pieces of dense material used to increase the mass or density of a system:
 in motor racing, metallic plates used to bring auto racing vehicles up to the minimum mandated weight
 in underwater diving, a diver weighting system is blocks of heavy material, usually lead, used to compensate for excess buoyancy of the diver and their equipment.
 Electrical ballast, used to stabilize the current flow in lamps
 Sailing ballast, ship's ballast, used to lower the centre of gravity of a ship to increase stability
 Track ballast, the layer of crushed rock or gravel upon which railway track is laid
 Ballast carried aboard an aircraft, for example:
 In gliding, weights added to maximise the average speed in cross-country competition, especially when thermal convection is strong
 In a balloon as a buoyancy compensator
 Ballast tractor, a heavy haulage road vehicle designed to pull or push heavy or exceptionally large loads

Places
Ballast, Coevorden, a village in the northeastern Netherlands
Ballast Head, a headland on Kangaroo Island, Australia
Ballast Head, South Australia, a locality
Ballast Point (Tampa), a neighborhood in Tampa, Florida, US

Other
 Ballast (film), a 2008 film about the effect of one man's suicide on three people
 Ballast (website), a Canadian news and cultural website
 "Ballast", a 1967 story of The Railway Series book Small Railway Engines